Brunila is a surname. Notable people with the surname include:

 Anne Brunila (born 1957), Finnish economist
 Teemu Brunila (born 1976), Finnish musician